Vladimir Nikolayevich Chernavin (22 April 1928 – 18 March 2023) was a Russian officer of the Soviet Navy. He served as the last commander-in-chief of the Soviet Navy from 1985 to 1991 and the only commander-in-chief of the Commonwealth of Independent States Navy from 1991 to 1992. He reached the rank of fleet admiral during his career.

Biography
Chernavin was born in Mykolaiv, Ukrainian SSR, in the Soviet Union. He entered the Higher Naval School in Baku in 1944 and graduated from the Frunze Higher Naval School in Leningrad (St. Petersburg) in 1951. He attended the Kuznetsov Naval Academy in 1962–65 and the General Staff Academy in 1967–69 after which he became divisional commander in 1969 and commanded the submarine flotillas of the Northern Fleet. In 1977 he was appointed commander of the Northern Fleet and in 1981 was awarded a title of the Hero of the Soviet Union. From 1981–85 he was chief of the main staff/1st deputy commander-in-chief of the Soviet Navy. He became the commander-in-chief of the Soviet Navy upon the retirement of Sergey Gorshkov. He retired in 1992. In retirement he was chairman of the Soviet submariners association. He has been a prominent attendee at Victory Day Parades as recently as 2019.

Chernavin died in Moscow on 18 March 2023, at the age of 94.

Honours and awards
Hero of the Soviet Union
Order of Lenin (twice)
Order of the October Revolution
Order of the Red Banner
Order of Aleksandr Nevsky
Order of the Red Star (twice)
Order of Courage
Order of Naval Merit
campaign and jubilee medals

References

Vladimir Chernavin at warheroes.ru

Literature
Энциклопедический словарь «История Отечества с древнейших времен до наших дней»

1928 births
2023 deaths
Soviet admirals
Soviet Navy personnel
Military personnel from Mykolaiv
Heroes of the Soviet Union
Recipients of the Order of Lenin
Recipients of the Order of the Red Banner
Recipients of the Order of the Red Star
Recipients of the Order of Courage
Recipients of the Order of Naval Merit (Russia)
Recipients of the Medal "For Distinction in Guarding the State Border of the USSR"
Recipients of the Medal of Zhukov
Recipients of the Scharnhorst Order
Tenth convocation members of the Supreme Soviet of the Soviet Union
Eleventh convocation members of the Supreme Soviet of the Soviet Union
Central Committee of the Communist Party of the Soviet Union members
Soviet submarine commanders
Military Academy of the General Staff of the Armed Forces of the Soviet Union alumni
N. G. Kuznetsov Naval Academy alumni